Lee Wright Stanley (May 2, 1885 in Topeka – February 11, 1970 in Cleveland) was an American cartoonist. He is best known for his long-running syndicated gag panel The Old Home Town, featuring small-town and hillbilly-type characters, which he drew for more than thirty years with his wife Harriet. 

Stanley started out as an editorial cartoonist, beginning in 1903.

The Old Home Town, originally syndicated by the Central Press Association (and later by King Features Syndicate), ran from January 3, 1923, until Stanley's retirement in 1966.

References

External links
 Lee W. Stanley Papers at Syracuse University

American cartoonists
American comics artists
1885 births
1970 deaths